Lucia Isabella Runkle (née Gilbert; August 20, 1844 – 1922), was an editorial writer and contributor to the New York Tribune and Harper's. She was one of the first women editorialists at a major American newspaper.

Biography 
Runkle was born in North Brookfield, Massachusetts and educated in Fall River and Worcester, Massachusetts. She moved to New York City and for many years she was an editorial writer and contributor to the New-York Tribune, in which she published a series of articles on cooking, treated from an artistic standpoint. She also wrote frequently for other journals and for magazines including the Christian Union, later The Outlook. For ten years, Runkle was the literary adviser of Harper & Brothers, her work including French and German manuscripts and books, as well as English. In 1893, she undertook, with Charles Dudley Warner and others, the enormous labor which is represented in the thirty volumes of Library of the World's Best Literature.

She was quoted in support of The Woman's Advocate publication. She corresponded with Helen Hunt Jackson.

Personal life 
In the early 1860s, she had an affair with future president James Garfield, who ended the affair after his wife learned of it.

In 1862, she married a Mr. Calhoun. Her second marriage, in 1869, was to Cornelius Runkle, a customs official and lawyer for the New-York Tribune. Their daughter Bertha Runkle authored The Helmet of Navarre and four other novels.

Selected works
Modern Women and What is Said of Them: A Reprint of a Series of Articles in the Saturday Review, by E. Lynn Linton, J. S. Redfield, New York (1868), contributor
Library of the world's best literature, ancient and modern, New York, R. S. Peale and J. A. Hill, (c1896-97), contributor

References

External link

1844 births
1922 deaths
People from North Brookfield, Massachusetts
19th-century American journalists
American women journalists
19th-century American non-fiction writers